Ricardo Ferreira Tavares (born 25 March 1995) is a Portuguese footballer who plays for U.D. Oliveirense, as a left back.

Football career
On 30 March 2013, Tavares made his debut with Sporting B in a 2012–13 Segunda Liga match against Benfica B replacing Gaël Etock (39th minute).

References

External links
 
 Stats and profile at LPFP
 

1995 births
People from São João da Madeira
Living people
Portuguese footballers
Association football defenders
Liga Portugal 2 players
Campeonato de Portugal (league) players
Sporting CP B players
FC Porto B players
A.D. Sanjoanense players
U.D. Oliveirense players
G.D. Estoril Praia players
Portugal youth international footballers
Sportspeople from Aveiro District